The 1905 Primera División was the 5th. season of top-flight football in Uruguay.

Overview
The tournament consisted of a round-robin championship. It involved six teams, and the champion was Montevideo Wanderers, being the first time that a club other than CURCC or Nacional won the Primera División.

As a curiosity during this championship, Nacional presented two teams to the competition, their official team and a second team formed by substitutes players, which was called "Nacional B". This was the first and only time in the editions of the Uruguayan Championships that a club participated with two teams.

Teams

League standings

References
Uruguay – List of final tables (RSSSF)

Uruguayan Primera División seasons
Uru
1